Emmeram is an unincorporated community in Herzog Township, Ellis County, Kansas, United States.

History
In 1899, Catholic parishioners from nearby Herzog established a new parish six miles to the north and began construction of Sacred Heart Church, which they completed in 1901. Originally named Norddorf, the community was renamed Emmeram after Emmeram Kausler, the church pastor. The community grew to include two schools, and a town plot was filed in 1902, but the town was never built. A post office operated in Emmeram from 1903 to 1904.

Geography
It lies approximately one-half mile northeast of Walker Creek, part of the Smoky Hill River watershed, in the Smoky Hills region of the Great Plains.

Transportation
Emmeram lies at the intersection of two unpaved county roads, Emmeram Road, which runs east–west, and 350th Avenue, which runs north–south.

References

Further reading

External links
 Ellis County maps: Current, Historic, KDOT

Unincorporated communities in Ellis County, Kansas
Unincorporated communities in Kansas